"Ev'rybody's Gonna Be Happy" is a song by Ray Davies, released as a UK single by the Kinks in 1965. As the follow-up to the number-one hit "Tired of Waiting for You", and having their previous three singles all chart among the top two, it was less successful, reaching number 17. It broke a run of what would have been thirteen consecutive top-ten singles in the UK.

The song was written as a musical experiment, rather than as an intended single, according to Davies in an interview, where he also claimed that the demo became the master version of it.

Background 
Both sides of the single were recorded in December 1964 in the same session as the B-side and final overdubs for "Tired of Waiting for You". "Ev'rybody's Gonna Be Happy" drew inspiration from the Earl Van Dyke trio, whom the Kinks had previously toured with. Upon hearing the playback, the Kinks producer Shel Talmy was skeptical of the single's release, as he did not like the sound, in contrast to Davies who was convinced that it would become a hit.

Following the disappointing performance in the UK, Reprise held off releasing the single in the US. They did release follow-up "Set Me Free" but when the next UK single "See My Friends" was judged to be even less suitable, they flipped the "Ev'rybody..." single with "Who'll Be the Next in Line" as the A-side, releasing it four months after the UK version. Although only a moderate hit, reaching number 34, it was more successful than "See My Friends" which, when it was eventually released in the US in September, failed to reach the Billboard Hot 100 (peaking at #111).

As well as being the US B-side, "Ev'rybody's Gonna Be Happy" was included as the first track on side 2 of the US version of the Kinda Kinks album.

Cash Box described it as a "catchy, high-spirited, rhythmic multi-beat teen-oriented terpsichorean item."

Personnel 
According to band researcher Doug Hinman:

The Kinks
Ray Davies lead vocal, piano
Dave Davies backing vocal, electric guitar
Pete Quaife backing vocal, bass
Mick Avory drums

Additional musicians
Rasa Davies backing vocal
Unidentified girlfriends of band members backing vocals

Charts

References

Sources

External links
The Official Ray Davies Web Site

1965 singles
The Kinks songs
Song recordings produced by Shel Talmy
Songs written by Ray Davies
Pye Records singles
1965 songs
Reprise Records singles